René Rafael Pinto Escobar (born November 2, 1996) is a Venezuelan professional baseball catcher for the Tampa Bay Rays of Major League Baseball (MLB).

Career
Pinto signed with the Tampa Bay Rays as an international free agent on October 1, 2013. Pinto spent the 2014 and 2015 seasons with the Venezuelan Summer League Rays; hitting .264/.318/.347/.666 with 1 home run and 11 RBI in 14' and .323/.379/.552/.931 with 6 home runs and 38 RBI in 2015. He split the 2016 season between the GCL Rays and the Princeton Rays, hitting a combined .262/.304/.483/.788 with 8 home runs and 28 RBI. Pinto split the 2017 season between the GCL and the Bowling Green Hot Rods, hitting a combined .290/.339/.396/.734 with 3 home runs and 39 RBI. He spent the 2018 season with the Charlotte Stone Crabs, hitting .301/.353/.407/.759 with 1 home run and 38 RBI. Pinto spent the 2019 season with the Montgomery Biscuits, hitting .235/.303/.354/.657 with 5 home runs and 30 RBI. He did not play in 2020 due to the cancellation of the Minor League Baseball season because of the COVID-19 pandemic. Pinto split the 2021 season between Montgomery and the Durham Bulls, hitting a combined .274/.325/.500/.825 with 20 home runs and 60 RBI.

On November 7, 2021, Tampa Bay selected Pinto's contract to the 40-man roster.

On April 22, 2022, Pinto was added to the Rays roster as a covid-replacement for Francisco Mejía. He made his MLB debut on April 26 against the Seattle Mariners. After Mike Zunino left the game with a left biceps injury, Pinto replaced him. In the same game, Pinto collected his first major league hit, a two-run home run off of Mariners reliever Matt Koch. He became the 10th player in Rays history to get a home run as his first MLB hit.

References

External links

1996 births
Living people
Sportspeople from Maracay
Venezuelan expatriate baseball players in the United States
Major League Baseball players from Venezuela
Major League Baseball catchers
Tampa Bay Rays players
Venezuelan Summer League Rays players
Gulf Coast Rays players
Princeton Rays players
Navegantes del Magallanes players
Bowling Green Hot Rods players
Charlotte Stone Crabs players
Montgomery Biscuits players
Leones del Escogido players
Durham Bulls players